The Chuya (Çuy) is a river in the Altai Republic in Russia, a right tributary of the Katun (Ob's basin). The river freezes in October or early November and thaws in late April. The town Kosh-Agach lies on the Chuya. The Chuya Highway (R256) runs through its valley. One of its tributaries is the Chibitka.

References

Rivers of the Altai Republic